John Garnet Exelby (born August 16, 1981) is a Canadian former professional ice hockey defenceman who played in the National Hockey League (NHL) with the Atlanta Thrashers and Toronto Maple Leafs. He was particularly known for his aggressive style of play and his checking abilities.

Playing career
After one season played with the Saskatoon Blades of the Western Hockey League (WHL) in 1998–99, Exelby was drafted by the Atlanta Thrashers in the eighth round, 217th overall, of the 1999 NHL Entry Draft. He would continue playing in the WHL for the next two season with the Blades and Regina Pats.

In the 2001–02 season, Exelby played in the American Hockey League (AHL) for the Chicago Wolves, winning the Calder Cup. Exelby was called-up by the Thrashers midway through the 2002–03 season.

On July 1, 2009, Exelby (along with Colin Stuart) was traded to the Toronto Maple Leafs in exchange for Pavel Kubina and Tim Stapleton.

Exelby became a free agent on July 1, 2010. He was invited on a try-out basis with the New York Rangers, but was released on September 27.

On November 26, 2010, Exelby signed a one-year contract with the Chicago Blackhawks, after which he was assigned to their AHL affiliate, the Rockford IceHogs.

On July 5, 2011, Exelby signed a one-year contract with the Detroit Red Wings with the expectation that he would provide depth for their AHL affiliate, the Grand Rapids Griffins.

On July 11, 2012, as a free agent, Exelby signed a one-year, two-way contract with the Boston Bruins. He did not make an appearance with Boston, instead serving as an alternate captain for their AHL affiliate, the Providence Bruins.

After captaining the Norfolk Admirals on one-year AHL contract in the 2013–14 season, and having not played in the NHL since 2010, on July 16, 2014, Exelby left North America to sign a one-year contract with Austrian Hockey League club Dornbirner EC. After 17 scoreless games with Dornbirner in the 2014–15 season, he opted to end his tenure in Austria, leaving the club on December 1, 2014.

Career statistics

Awards and honours

Career transactions
 Selected by the Atlanta Thrashers in the 1999 NHL Entry Draft as an eighth round choice, 217th overall.
 Traded to Regina Pats (WHL) by Saskatoon Blades (WHL) for Scott Balan and future considerations, January 15, 2001.
 Called up during the NHL 2002–03 season.
 Traded to Toronto Maple Leafs along with Colin Stuart for Pavel Kubina and Tim Stapleton, July 1, 2009
 Signed to the Detroit Red Wings, July 5, 2011
 Signed by the Boston Bruins as a free agent, July 11, 2012

References

External links

1981 births
Living people
Atlanta Thrashers draft picks
Atlanta Thrashers players
Canadian expatriate ice hockey players in Austria
Canadian expatriate ice hockey players in the United States
Canadian ice hockey defencemen
Dornbirn Bulldogs players
Grand Rapids Griffins players
Ice hockey people from Saskatchewan
Norfolk Admirals players
People from Craik, Saskatchewan
Providence Bruins players
Regina Pats players
Rockford IceHogs (AHL) players
Saskatoon Blades players
Toronto Maple Leafs players
Winnipeg South Blues players